Segersjö is a suburb of Tumba in Botkyrka Municipality, Stockholm County, southeastern Sweden.

Gallery

References

Populated places in Botkyrka Municipality
Södermanland